Vanaz is a Pune Metro station in Pune, India and a terminal station of the Aqua line. The station was opened on 6 March 2022 as an inauguration of Pune Metro.Currently Aqua Line is operational between Vanaz and Garware College.

It is the only station to have 3 levels, two concourses and one platform level. The lower concourse is unfinished and will be opened afterwards.

Station Layout

The track beyond the station leads to Vanaz Depot and the DPR for a planned extension to Chandani Chowk is underway.

References

Pune Metro stations
Railway stations in India opened in 2022